is a railway station located in the city of Kakamigahara,  Gifu Prefecture,  Japan, operated by the private railway operator Meitetsu.

Lines

Station layout
Shiminkōen-mae Station has two opposed ground-level side platforms. The station is unattended.

Platforms

Adjacent stations

History
The station was closed from 1944 to September 15, 1946. It was renamed to its present name on July 9, 1989.

Surrounding area
Gifu Public Park

See also
 List of Railway Stations in Japan

External links

  

Railway stations in Japan opened in 1926
Stations of Nagoya Railroad
Railway stations in Gifu Prefecture
Kakamigahara, Gifu